Ruellia hypericoides (syn. Dipteracanthus hypericoides Nees) is a plant native to the Cerrado vegetation of Brazil. This plant is cited in Flora Brasiliensis by Carl Friedrich Philipp von Martius.

hypericoides
Flora of Brazil